The Institute of Permaculture and Ecovillage of the Cerrado is an experimental educational design center and international community located on the Cerrado savanna  of Brazil. IPEC began on a bare, degraded cattle pasture in 1998 to teach and demonstrate permaculture and to apply this information in the construction of a prototype ecological village, or ecovillage. The community exists on 25 hectares (60 acres) of land and is located in Pirenópolis, in the state of Goiás, central Brazil. IPEC is connected to the national university in Brasilia as well as many government ministries, schools and other non-profit organizations.

Ecoversidade is IPEC’s educational arm and is dedicated to education for sustainable living by fostering a profound understanding of the natural world, grounded in direct experience, that leads to sustainable patterns of living. Ecoversidade functions as a model of viable rural settlement, incorporating the realities of appropriate technology, living systems and sustainable community life from a holistic perspective.

IPEC is also the host of the 8th International Permaculture Convergence , taking place May 22–25, 2007 to provide a unique opportunity for permaculturalists to set continental and global agendas, make appropriate connections, and share innovative experiences.

References

External links
   Official IPEC website 
   Living Routes Study Abroad at IPEC 
   PAL information on IPEC
   Australian Permaculture Association info on IPEC

Cultural centers in Brazil
Education in Goiás
Environmental organisations based in Brazil
Cerrado